Montagnais (meaning mountaineers in French) may refer to:

 Innu people, a First Nation in Canada (note that the Innu are not Inuit)
 Montagnais of Natashquan, an Innu First Nation band government in Quebec
 Old Montagnais, the period in the history of the Innu language preceding its current form.
 Innu language
 Chipewyan people, a Dene Indigenous Canadian people
 Montagnais crater, a crater off the coast of Nova Scotia
 Poste Montagnais, Quebec, an electrical substation in Quebec, on the transmission lines connecting to the Churchill Falls Generating Station.
 Poste Montagnais Airport, an airport at the electrical substation in Quebec

See also
Montagnard (disambiguation), another French term with the same meaning